is a Japanese fashion model and singer. She was born from Kyoto Prefecture. She is represented with IMS Entertainment.

She is a former member of Vision Factory's girls' quartet dance and vocal unit Hinoi Team.

Biography

On 3 July 2002, she formed the three person music unit Love&Peace with Miho Hiroshige and Asuka Hinoi, and released the single "Drifter" (PCCA-1699).
On 18 May 2005, she released the single "Ike Ike" as a member of Hinoi Team.
From 1 September 2008, her diary "Hikaru wa Eien Tsuru wa Sen Nen Kame wa Man Nen" was deleted from her affiliated office's mobile website.
On 3 June 2012, she was selected as the first student of the Kansai Collection
She appeared on 17 September 2012 at the Kansai Collection 2012 A/W (4th, Kyocera Dome Osaka).
On 3 March 2013, she appeared in Kansai Collection 2013 S/S (5th, Kyocera Dome Osaka) Nails Unique stage.
She appeared as guest model on Tokyo Fashion Collection (Pacifico Yokohama) on 12 July 2014.

Filmography

Films
Kūga no Shiro: Joshi Keimusho (published 26 Mar 2017, Director: Wataru Oku) – as Yuki Ninomiya

Direct-to-video
Kūga no Shiro: Joshi Keimusho 2 (May 2017, Director: Wataru Oku) – as Yuki Ninomiya

Bibliography
Love Berry (– Mar 2008 issue) Tokuma Shoten
3-Kagetsu Mae kara Hajimeru Beauty Hanayome Book, Gentosha – image model

References

External links
 
 
 – Ameba Blog 
YouTube channel HikaTube
Nobuyuki Nose no Shūkan Anzen Hoshō (Houdoukyoku24)

Japanese female models
Japanese women pop singers
Avex Group artists
Models from Kyoto Prefecture
1991 births
Living people
21st-century Japanese singers
21st-century Japanese women singers
Hinoi Team members